Gavin Swankie (born 22 November 1983) is a retired Scottish footballer. Capable of playing in midfield and as a forward, his previous clubs include Forfar Athletic, Dundee, St Johnstone and Arbroath.

Club career
Swankie signed for Dundee after his contract at Arbroath ended having come through the youth ranks at Gayfield Park. He made 73 starts for Arbroath, as well as 32 substitute appearances, scoring seven goals. He returned to Arbroath on loan in January 2006 until the end of the season and then returned to Dundee, where he featured regularly over the next two seasons.

On 1 May 2008, Swankie signed for Dundee's Tayside rivals St Johnstone. He was released at the end of the 2009–10 season.

Swankie then signed for a third spell at Arbroath. He won the PFA Scotland Players' Player of the Year and Scottish Football League Player of the Year awards for the Third Division in the 2010–11 campaign, and his goals helped Arbroath win their first senior league championship.

Swankie signed for Forfar Athletic in the 2012 summer transfer window. On 3 August 2013, he was the hero for Forfar Athletic when his two goals helped beat Rangers 2–1 in the Scottish League Cup at Station Park. This was Forfar's first victory against Rangers. 

In July 2017, with one-year left on his contract, Swankie was placed on the transfer list by Forfar after he had intimated that he wished to leave the club, and on 4 July 2017, he signed with former club Arbroath for a fee of £8,000.

Career statistics

References

External links
 
 

1983 births
Arbroath F.C. players
Dundee F.C. players
Association football midfielders
Living people
People from Arbroath
Scottish Football League players
Scottish footballers
St Johnstone F.C. players
Scottish Premier League players
Forfar Athletic F.C. players
Scottish Professional Football League players
Footballers from Angus, Scotland